Jane Marie Garibay (born September 26, 1955) is an American politician who serves in the Connecticut House of Representatives representing the 60th district in Hartford County.

Political career

Election
Garibay was elected in the general election on November 6, 2018, winning 53 percent of the vote over 47 percent of Republican incumbent Scott Storms.

References

 Connecticut Democrats
Garibay, Jane 
Living people
21st-century American politicians
21st-century American women politicians
Women state legislators in Connecticut
1955 births